

The Delta Pegass is a Czech two-seat ultralight cabin monoplane designed and built by Delta System-Air.

Design
The Pegass is a strut-braced high-wing monoplane powered by either an  Rotax 912UL or a  Rotax 582UL engine driving a three-bladed tractor propeller. It has a fixed tricycle landing gear and a cabin with two seats side-by-side, a door on each side of the fuselage for access.

Specifications (Rotax 912UL)

References

Notes

Bibliography

1990s Czech and Czechoslovakian civil utility aircraft
Homebuilt aircraft
Single-engined tractor aircraft
High-wing aircraft
Pegass